Nicola López (1975) is an American contemporary artist known for her drawings, prints, installations and collages.

Early life
López was born in Santa Fe, New Mexico, in 1975. She studied at the Escola de Artes Visuais (School of Visual Arts) in Rio de Janeiro, Brazil in 1996. She earned a BA in 1998 and an MFA in visual arts from Columbia University in 2004.

López lives in Brooklyn, New York, and she teaches at Columbia University.

Exhibitions

Solo exhibitions
2019 “Nicola López: Parasites, Prosthetics, Parallels and Partners,” Tamarind Institute, Albuquerque, New Mexico
2013 "Land and Illusion," Pace Prints Gallery, New York 
2011 "Intervals: Nicola López," Solomon R. Guggenheim Museum, New York
2009 "Nicola López: Urban Transformations," Chazen Museum, Madison
2008 “Constriction Zone,” Franklin Art Works, Minneapolis
Metropolitan Museum of Art, New York
La Calera Oaxaca

Group exhibitions
2022 "Becoming Land," Albuquerque Museum, Albuquerque, New Mexico
2007 "Orpheus Selection: Nicola López & Lisa Sigal," Museum of Modern Art, New York
2005 “Greater New York 2005,” P.S.1 Contemporary Art Center
Los Angeles County Museum of Art
Museo Rufino Tamayo, Mexico City
Denver Art Museum

Public collections
MOMA, New York
Madison Museum of Contemporary Art, Madison, WI 
University of New Mexico Art Museum, Albuquerque, NM 
Museo Nacional de la Estampa, México D.F., México
Metropolitan Museum of Art, New York
Irish Museum of Modern Art

References

1975 births
Living people
21st-century American artists
Artists from Santa Fe, New Mexico
Columbia University School of the Arts alumni
Columbia College (New York) alumni
21st-century American women artists